Aslan Pençesi is a 1966 Turkish crime film, directed by Memduh Ün and starring Ayhan Işık, Sevinç Pekin and Turgut Özatay. It was written by Halit Refiğ.

References

External links
Aslan pençesi at the Internet Movie Database

1966 films
Turkish crime films
1966 crime films
Films directed by Memduh Ün